Stephen John Goldsmith (14 June 1868 – 17 May 1951) was a South African cricketer. He played in two first-class matches for Eastern Province in 1893/94.

References

External links
 

1868 births
1951 deaths
South African cricketers
Eastern Province cricketers
Cricketers from Port Elizabeth